Elio Pandolfi (17 June 1926 – 11 October 2021) was an Italian stage, film and television actor, radio personality, and voice actor.

Life and career 
Born in Rome, Pandolfi got a degree in accounting, and then he enrolled at the Silvio d’Amico Academy of Dramatic Arts graduating in 1948. Pandolfi also appeared as a  character actor in a number of films, mainly in humorous roles. He was also active as a voice actor and a dubber.

Pandolfi died on 11 October 2021, at the age of 95.

Selected filmography
 In Olden Days (1951)
 Totò lascia o raddoppia?  (1956)
 Son of the Red Corsair (1959)
 Tough Guys (1960)
 Obiettivo ragazze  (1963)
 The Magnificent Adventurer (1964)
 For a Few Dollars Less (1966)
 The Most Beautiful Couple in the World (1968)
 When Men Carried Clubs and Women Played Ding-Dong (1971)
 Rugantino (1973) 
 Too Much Romance... It's Time for Stuffed Peppers (2004)

References

External links 

1926 births
2021 deaths
Male actors from Rome
Italian male stage actors
Italian male film actors
Italian male television actors
Italian male voice actors
Accademia Nazionale di Arte Drammatica Silvio D'Amico alumni
Mass media people from Rome